Vinton is a ghost town in Nicholas County, in the U.S. state of West Virginia.

History
A post office called Vinton was established in 1877, and remained in operation until 1940. The community most likely was named after the local Vinton family.

References

Ghost towns in West Virginia
Landforms of Nicholas County, West Virginia